Thomas Ellis Glover (1891–1938) was a cartoonist, caricaturist, court reporter and journalist, working in New Zealand and Australia.

Glover was born in England but moved to New Zealand as a child. His career is generally considered to have started when, while working as an 'elevator boy' he drew and exhibited caricatures of his passengers. In New Zealand, he cartooned for the Truth (1911–1922) while also contributing to the Free Lance (1918–1922) under the name T Ellis.

Glover began working for the Sydney Bulletin in 1922 before moving to the Sydney Sun in the 1930s.

Glover 'died suddenly at his desk' at the Sun in 1938.

References

External links 
 Search for work by Tom Glover on DigitalNZ

New Zealand cartoonists
New Zealand caricaturists
British emigrants to New Zealand
1891 births
1938 deaths
20th-century New Zealand journalists